Mileta is a masculine given name and a surname of Slavic origin. It may refer to:

Masculine given name
Mileta Jakšić (1863–1935), poet
Mileta Lisica (born 1966), basketball player
Mileta Radulović (born 1981), football goalkeeper

Surname
Jeronim Mileta (1871–1947), Catholic bishop

See also
 Miletić
 Miletina

Slavic masculine given names
Serbian masculine given names